Pipestone may refer to:

Places

Canada
 Pipestone, Manitoba
 Pipestone No. 92, Saskatchewan, Canada, a former name of the Rural Municipality of Walpole No. 92
 Pipestone Creek, in central Alberta, Canada
 Pipestone Creek (Saskatchewan), river that flows from Saskatchewan into Manitoba
 Pipestone Pass (Alberta), a pass in Banff National Park, Alberta (see List of passes of the Rocky Mountains)
 Pipestone River (disambiguation), any of several rivers or creeks in Canada
 Pipestone Lake (Saskatchewan), a lake in southern Saskatchewan
 Pipestone Lake (Manitoba), a lake in central Manitoba
 Rural Municipality of Pipestone

United States
 Pipestone Township, Michigan
 Pipestone, Minnesota
 Pipestone County, Minnesota
 Pipestone Pass (Montana), a pass on the Continental Divide of the Americas in Montana
 Pipestone National Monument, located near Pipestone, Minnesota
 Pipestone Region, in southwest Minnesota
 Pipestone Creek (Big Sioux River tributary)

Other uses
 Catlinite, a type of red, carvable rock used by Native Americans for pipes and effigies
 Pipestone Area High School, the public high school in Pipestone, Minnesota
 Pipestone Area School District, the public school district serving the community of Pipestone
 Pipestone Golf Course, in Miamisburg, Ohio, USA